In biology, the BBCH-scale for musaceae describes the phenological development of musaceae using the BBCH-scale.

The phenological growth stages and BBCH-identification keys of musaceae are:

 Harvested product
 post-harvest or storage treatments take place at stage 99, 909 or 9090

References

External links
 A downloadable version of the BBCH Scales

BBCH-scale